Saara-Sofia Maria Sirén (born 10 July 1986 in Mikkeli) is a Finnish politician currently serving in the Parliament of Finland for the National Coalition Party at the Finland Proper constituency.

References

1986 births
Living people
People from Mikkeli
National Coalition Party politicians
Members of the Parliament of Finland (2015–19)
Members of the Parliament of Finland (2019–23)
21st-century Finnish women politicians
Women members of the Parliament of Finland